Sabine Beate Zwiener (born 5 December 1967, in Sontheim) is a retired German middle-distance runner who specialised in the 800 metres. She won the gold medal at the 1988 European Indoor Championships and silver at the 1990 European Indoor Championships. She competed at the 1992 Summer Olympics and 1993 World Championships.

Her personal bests in the event are 1:59.33 outdoors (Düsseldorf 1988) and 2:01.19 indoors (Budapest 1988).

International competitions

References

1967 births
Living people
German female middle-distance runners
West German female middle-distance runners
Olympic athletes of Germany
Athletes (track and field) at the 1992 Summer Olympics
People from Heidenheim (district)
Sportspeople from Stuttgart (region)
World Athletics Championships athletes for Germany
20th-century German women